State Route 16 (SR 16) is a numbered state highway in Maine, United States. SR 16 runs from the New Hampshire state line (signed as NH-16) at Wentworth Location (near Lake Aziscohos) in the west to Orono at the eastern terminus.

Route 16 follows a rather circuitous route between the two states, originating in Portsmouth, New Hampshire, at Interstate 95, and re-intersecting Interstate 95 some  later in Orono.

History
As originally designated, SR 16 crossed the state from Haines Landing to New Brunswick. In 1936, it was rerouted to extend west from Oquossoc to the New Hampshire border. In 1949, the route was truncated to Milo, but, in 1955, it was extended to its current eastern terminus in Orono.

Route description
SR 16 begins at the western border of the state in Magalloway Township. It then takes a northeasterly route through Oxford County, passing through Rangeley along the way. In Eustis, the route turns southeasterly along with SR 27 into Somerset County. It then takes a northwards jog parallelling US 201 before crossing it in Bingham and turning eastwards. This eastwards direction continues until the route reaches Milo, where it turns southward once again to its terminus in Orono.

Major intersections

References

External links

016
Transportation in Oxford County, Maine
Transportation in Piscataquis County, Maine
Transportation in Penobscot County, Maine
Transportation in Somerset County, Maine
North Maine Woods